Gaston Étienne (21 February 1902 – 2 April 1995) was a Belgian athlete. He competed in the men's javelin throw and the men's decathlon at the 1928 Summer Olympics.

References

1902 births
1995 deaths
Athletes (track and field) at the 1928 Summer Olympics
Belgian male javelin throwers
Belgian decathletes
Olympic athletes of Belgium
Place of birth missing